David Paul Valcourt is a retired lieutenant general of the United States Army. He served as the Deputy Commanding General and Chief of Staff, United States Army Training and Doctrine Command from February 25, 2008, to May 3, 2010, after serving as Commanding General, Eight United States Army. He was previously the Commanding General of the Field Artillery Center and Fort Sill, Oklahoma.

He was the Commanding General of the Eighth United States Army and the Chief of Staff of United States Forces Korea, Combined Forces Command, and the United Nations Command in the Republic of Korea.

Valcourt is a native of Chicopee Falls, Massachusetts, graduated from the United States Military Academy at West Point with a B.S. degree and was commissioned a Second Lieutenant in the Field Artillery (FA) on 6 June 1973. He later earned an M.S. degree in Physical Education from Springfield College in 1983 and an M.A. degree in National Security and Strategic Studies from the Naval War College. Valcourt has held a variety of command and staff positions.

He holds the Army Distinguished Service Medal, Defense Superior Service Medal, the Legion of Merit with 4 Oak Leaf Clusters, and the Defense Meritorious Service Medal, among other medals.

Major Decorations and Badges
  Army Distinguished Service Medal
  Defense Superior Service Medal
  Legion of Merit with four oak leaf clusters
  Defense Meritorious Service Medal
Meritorious Service Medal
Army Commendation Medal
Army Achievement Medal
National Defense Service Medal with two stars
Korea Defense Service Medal
Humanitarian Service Medal
Army Service Ribbon
Overseas Service Ribbon

See also

References

External links

Official Biography (U.S. Army Training and Doctrine Command)
(Sterling joins TRADOC as new deputy commanding general, chief of staff

1951 births
Living people
United States Army Field Artillery Branch personnel
People from Chicopee, Massachusetts
United States Military Academy alumni
Springfield College (Massachusetts) alumni
Naval War College alumni
Recipients of the Legion of Merit
United States Army generals
Recipients of the Defense Superior Service Medal
Recipients of the Distinguished Service Medal (US Army)
Military personnel from Massachusetts